"Unwashed and Somewhat Slightly Dazed" is a song by English musician David Bowie, released on his 1969 album David Bowie. It was one of the first songs produced by Tony Visconti.

Inspiration 
In July 1969, Bowie performed at the Maltese Music Festival while his father became sick and later died. The feel of the song was meant to show Bowie's feelings after his father's death.

The song also seems to be about social structure, as the girl in the song is very wealthy compared to the narrator. Bowie said that the song was written because he got "funny stares" from people.

Song structure 
The song opens with acoustic Asus2 and D9 chords. This repeats until the song enters the main structure, a new beat with guitars and harmonica. This part of the song mainly switches between C and F, but occasionally uses other chords as well. After the lyrics finish, the music continues for about two minutes before ending.

Review after "Blackstar" 
After the release of "Blackstar" and the death of David Bowie, several lists were created that cited "Unwashed and Somewhat Slightly Dazed" as an important song in Bowie's history. Rolling Stone says that the song is "pretty unremarkable except for one thing: It's the first Tony Visconti-produced David Bowie track the world ever heard." Hillary E. Crawford shares this opinion, only including it because "This track, which immediately follows "Space Oddity," was the first to be produced by Tony Visconti, the man who also produced Bowie's last album Blackstar."

Personnel 
According to Chris O'Leary:

David Bowie – lead vocal
Keith Christmas – 12-string acoustic guitar
Mick Wayne – lead guitar
Tim Renwick – rhythm guitar
John Lodge – bass
John Cambridge – drums
Benny Marshall – harmonica
Unknown musicians – saxophones, trumpets
Tony Visconti – producer

References

Sources 

David Bowie songs
1969 songs
Songs written by David Bowie